Jindabyne Dam is a major ungated rockfill embankment dam across the Snowy River in the Snowy Mountains of New South Wales, Australia. The dam's main purpose is for the generation of hydro-power and is one of the sixteen major dams that comprise the Snowy Mountains Scheme, a vast hydroelectricity and irrigation complex constructed in south-east Australia between 1949 and 1974 and now run by Snowy Hydro.

The impounded reservoir is called Lake Jindabyne.

Location and features
The dam was constructed by a consortium of Utah-Brown and Sudamericana based on engineering plans developed under contract by the Snowy Mountains Hydroelectric Authority. Construction of the dam flooded the settlement of Old Jindabyne that accommodated approximately 300 people. Parts of Old Jindabyne can be seen when the levels of Lake Jindabyne are low. The settlement of East Jindabyne is located above what was Old Jindabyne.

At 100% capacity the dam wall holds back  of water. The spillway is capable of discharging .

Work to modify the dam spillway commenced in 1994 and was ongoing as at July 2009.

Lake Jindabyne

Lake Jindabyne receives the flow from the Snowy River as well as its tributaries, the Thredbo River and Eucumbene River.

The Jindabyne pumping station pumps the water from the rivers into the Snowy-Murray tunnel where it flows west through Murray 1 and Murray 2 Power Stations before entering the Swampy Plains River and then the Murray River. The flow of water into Lake Jindabyne is particularly strong during the spring months of October and November.

The idea of the Snowy Mountains Scheme was developed in the 1940s as a way of increasing the flow of inland rivers in order to encourage the development of primary industries based on irrigation. After the Lake was built, the flow of water into the Snowy River was only 1% of the amount that flowed before the river was dammed. This caused concerns about the state of the lower reaches of the Snowy River in Victoria and NSW.

A Victorian parliamentary committee recommended in October 1998 that the flow into the Snowy River be increased to 15%. Craig Ingram was elected to the Victorian Parliament as the independent member of East Gippsland with a promise to increase the flow into the Snowy River. After the 1999 election, Ingram was one of a handful of independents who reached an agreement with Steve Bracks, the leader of the Victorian ALP. In 2000, the NSW and Victorian Governments reached a long-term agreement to increase the flow of water into the Snowy to 28%.

Recreational uses
Lake Jindabyne is a popular sailing and fishing destination. The body of water is one of the largest fresh water reservoirs in New South Wales, and has a resident population of Atlantic Salmon, Brook Trout and Rainbow Trout. Lake Jindabyne also has a reputation as one of the best places to catch trout in Australia.

In 1969 the Eucumbene Sailing Club moved to Lake Jindabyne and formed the Lake Jindabyne Yacht Club as conditions were not as rough as Lake Eucumbene. The club operates from November until April every year with racing in nineteen different classes of boat.

It is also a popular venue for waterskiing and sailing during spring, summer and autumn.

Gallery

See also

 Kosciuszko National Park
 List of dams and reservoirs in New South Wales
 Snowy Scheme Museum

References

External links
 

Snowy Mountains Scheme
Jindabyne
Rock-filled dams
Embankment dams
Dams completed in 1967
1967 establishments in Australia